The spatulasnout catshark (Apristurus platyrhynchus), also known as the Borneo catshark or flatnose catshark, is a catshark of the family Scyliorhinidae, found in the western Pacific between 35°N and 1° N. Its length is up to 80 cm.

References

 

spatulasnout catshark
Fish of East Asia
Fish of Japan
Taxa named by Shigeho Tanaka
spatulasnout catshark